Thérèse Caval (1750–1795), was a French revolutionary. She is regarded as a symbolic heroine of the French revolution in Marseilles. With Elisabeth Taneron, she is regarded as the leading figure in the hanging of the anti revolutionary Cayole in 1792. In 1795, she was one of 26 murdered in a massacre performed by royalist forces.

Notes

Sources 
Académie de Marseille, Dictionnaire des Marseillais, Edisud, Marseille, 2003.

1750 births
1795 deaths
People of the French Revolution
People from Marseille
French murder victims
People killed in the French Revolution
People who died in prison custody during the French Revolution